The Time Hoppers is a science fiction novel by American writer Robert Silverberg, first published by Doubleday in 1967.  The plot concerns Joe Quellen, a 25th-century bureaucrat charged with investigating "hoppers", travelers from the future whose presence in the past has been documented for hundreds of years, and his brother-in-law, Norman Pomrath, an unemployed blue collar worker who ends up being presented with an opportunity to travel back in time.

Plot
Joe Quellen is a Class Seven bureaucrat in a highly stratified, overpopulated 25th century Earth with a one world government.  Those who are in lower classes, such as his sister and brother-in-law in Classes Fourteen and Fifteen, only have the privilege of a one room apartment with even the shower out for full display.  Oxygen is rationed.  Quellen has managed to find a house for himself in Africa, but if this is discovered he would be severely punished as living space in the world is at a premium.  The level of technology is highly advanced; teleportation is a reality, as is time travel.  When the novel opens, Quellen's superiors have discovered that missing segments of the population have time traveled back into the past in order to experience a better quality of life; they don't know whether to be happy that they'd shed thousands of people, or upset that the time travelers may be changing history.  Quellen is assigned the task of dealing with the situation.

External links
The Time Hoppers entry on Majipoor.com.

Novels by Robert Silverberg
Doubleday (publisher) books
1967 American novels
Novels set in the 25th century
Novels about time travel